The Battle of La Mesa was the final battle of the California Campaign during the Mexican–American War, occurring on January 9, 1847, in present-day Vernon, California, the day after the Battle of Rio San Gabriel. The battle was a victory for the United States Army under Commodore Robert F. Stockton and General Stephen Watts Kearny.

Background
Not finding any Californians at Governor Pío Pico's ranch, the Americans under Stockton and Kearny crossed the plain between the San Gabriel River and the Los Angeles River called La Mesa. They encountered José María Flores' 300-strong force of Californio militia, including artillery, near where the city of Vernon now stands, about four miles south of Los Angeles.

Battle
The Californian guns were ineffective, while the American guns responded from their square as the Americans advanced. Flores extended his line and brought up two more guns. Stockton halted and formed his guns into a single battery. After fifteen minutes, Stockton's fire drove the Californian artillery from effective range. Flores sent his lancers against the American left flank but were driven back; most of his men deserted, allowing the Americans to advance into Los Angeles.

Aftermath
The battle was the last armed resistance to the American conquest of California, and General José María Flores returned to Mexico afterward. Three days after the battle, on January 12, the last significant group of residents surrendered to U.S. forces. The conquest and annexation of Alta California was settled with the signing of the Treaty of Cahuenga by U.S. Army Lieutenant-Colonel John C. Frémont and Mexican General Andrés Pico on January 13, 1847.

The site of the battle is now registered as California Historical Landmark #167. The marker is located at 4490 Exchange Avenue at Downey Road in Vernon.

California Historical Landmark Marker

California Historical Landmark Marker NO. 167 at the site reads:
NO. 167 LA MESA BATTLEFIELD - La Mesa Battlefield served as a campsite for the California forces under General Castro in the summer of 1846, during the United States' occupation of California in the Mexican War. The battle of La Mesa, last military encounter of the war on the California front, was fought here January 9, 1847.

See also
 List of conflicts in the United States
 Battles of the Mexican–American War
 Captain John Strother Griffin (1816–1898), physician during the battle

References

Further reading
 Bancroft, Hubert Howe (1882). The Works of Hubert Howe Bancroft. San Francisco: A.L. Bancroft & Co. .

1847 in Mexico
California Historical Landmarks
History of Los Angeles
Battles of the Conquest of California
Vernon, California
United States Marine Corps in the 18th and 19th centuries
January 1847 events